Lactase is an enzyme produced by many organisms. It is located in the brush border of the small intestine of humans and other mammals. Lactase is essential to the complete digestion of whole milk; it breaks down lactose, a sugar which gives milk its sweetness. People who have deficiency of lactase, and consume dairy products, may experience the symptoms of lactose intolerance. Lactase can be purchased as a food supplement, and is added to milk to produce "lactose-free" milk products.

Lactase (also known as lactase-phlorizin hydrolase, or LPH), a part of the β-galactosidase family of enzymes, is a glycoside hydrolase involved in the hydrolysis of the disaccharide lactose into constituent galactose and glucose monomers. Lactase is present predominantly along the brush border membrane of the differentiated enterocytes lining the villi of the small intestine. In humans, lactase is encoded by the LCT gene on chromosome 2.

Uses

Food use 
Lactase is an enzyme that some people are unable to produce in their small intestine. Technology to produce lactose-free milk, ice cream, and yogurt was developed by the USDA Agricultural Research Service in 1985. This technology is used to add lactase to milk, thereby hydrolyzing the lactose naturally found in milk, leaving it slightly sweet but digestible by everyone. Without lactase, lactose intolerant people pass the lactose undigested to the colon where bacteria break it down, creating carbon dioxide and that leads to bloating and flatulence.

Medical use 
Lactase supplements are sometimes used to treat lactose intolerance.

Industrial use 
Lactase produced commercially can be extracted both from yeasts such as Kluyveromyces fragilis and Kluyveromyces lactis and from molds, such as Aspergillus niger and Aspergillus oryzae. Its primary commercial use, in supplements and products such as those from Lacteeze and Lactaid, is to break down lactose in milk to make it suitable for people with lactose intolerance. The U.S. Food and Drug Administration has not independently evaluated these products.

Lactase (or a similar form of beta-galactosidase) is also used to screen for blue white colonies in the multiple cloning sites of various plasmid vectors in Escherichia coli or other bacteria.

Mechanism 
The optimum temperature for human lactase is about 37 °C and the optimum pH is 6.

In metabolism, the β-glycosidic bond in D-lactose is hydrolyzed to form D-galactose and D-glucose, which can be absorbed through the intestinal walls and into the bloodstream. The overall reaction that lactase catalyzes is C12H22O11 + H2O → C6H12O6 + C6H12O6 + heat.

The catalytic mechanism of D-lactose hydrolysis retains the substrate anomeric configuration in the products. While the details of the mechanism are uncertain, the stereochemical retention is achieved off a double displacement reaction. Studies of E. coli lactase have proposed that hydrolysis is initiated when a glutamate nucleophile on the enzyme attacks from the axial side of the galactosyl carbon in the β-glycosidic bond. The removal of the D-glucose leaving group may be facilitated by Mg-dependent acid catalysis. The enzyme is liberated from the α-galactosyl moiety upon equatorial nucleophilic attack by water, which produces D-galactose.

Substrate modification studies have demonstrated that the 3′-OH and 2′-OH moieties on the galactopyranose ring are essential for enzymatic recognition and hydrolysis. The 3′-hydroxy group is involved in initial binding to the substrate while the 2′- group is not necessary for recognition but needed in subsequent steps. This is demonstrated by the fact that a 2-deoxy analog is an effective competitive inhibitor (Ki = 10mM). Elimination of specific hydroxyl groups on the glucopyranose moiety does not eliminate catalysis.

Lactase also catalyzes the conversion of phlorizin to phloretin and glucose.

Structure and biosynthesis 
Preprolactase, the primary translation product, has a single polypeptide primary structure consisting of 1927 amino acids. It can be divided into five domains: (i) a 19-amino-acid cleaved signal sequence; (ii) a large prosequence domain that is not present in mature lactase; (iii) the mature lactase segment; (iv) a membrane-spanning hydrophobic anchor; and (v) a short hydrophilic carboxyl terminus. The signal sequence is cleaved in the endoplasmic reticulum, and the resulting 215-kDa pro-LPH is sent to the Golgi apparatus, where it is heavily glycosylated and proteolytically processed to its mature form. The prodomain has been shown to act as an intramolecular chaperone in the ER, preventing trypsin cleavage and allowing LPH to adopt the necessary 3-D structure to be transported to the Golgi apparatus.

Mature human lactase consists of a single 160-kDa polypeptide chain that localizes to the brush border membrane of intestinal epithelial cells. It is oriented with the N-terminus outside the cell and the C-terminus in the cytosol. LPH contains two catalytic glutamic acid sites. In the human enzyme, the lactase activity has been connected to Glu-1749, while Glu-1273 is the site of phlorizin hydrolase function.

Genetic expression and regulation 
Lactase is encoded by a single genetic locus on chromosome 2. It is expressed exclusively by mammalian small intestine enterocytes and in very low levels in the colon during fetal development. Humans are born with high levels of lactase expression. In most of the world's population, lactase transcription is down-regulated after weaning, resulting in diminished lactase expression in the small intestine, which causes the common symptoms of adult-type hypolactasia, or lactose intolerance.

Some population segments exhibit lactase persistence resulting from a mutation that is postulated to have occurred 5,000–10,000 years ago, coinciding with the rise of cattle domestication. This mutation has allowed almost half of the world's population to metabolize lactose without symptoms. Studies have linked the occurrence of lactase persistence to two different single-nucleotide polymorphisms about 14 and 22 kilobases upstream of the 5’-end of the LPH gene. Both mutations, C→T at position -13910 and G→ A at position -22018, have been independently linked to lactase persistence.

The lactase promoter is 150 base pairs long and is located upstream of the site of transcription initiation. The sequence is highly conserved in mammals, suggesting that critical cis-transcriptional regulators are located nearby. Cdx-2, HNF-1α, and GATA have been identified as transcription factors. Studies of hypolactasia onset have demonstrated that despite polymorphisms, little difference exists in lactase expression in infants, showing that the mutations become increasingly relevant during development. Developmentally regulated DNA-binding proteins may down-regulate transcription or destabilize mRNA transcripts, causing decreased LPH expression after weaning.

See also 

 MCM6
 Lactase persistence

References

External links 

The Lactase Protein
E. coli β-galactosidase: 
Gene Ontology for Lactase
Making of the Fittest: Got Lactase? The Co-evolution of Genes and Culture
Lactase persistence shows indication of association with Obesity
PDBe-KB provides an overview of all the structure information available in the PDB for Human Beta-galactosidase 
PDBe-KB provides an overview of all the structure information available in the PDB for Escherichia coli Beta-galactosidase

Food additives
Antiflatulents
EC 3.2.1
Genes on human chromosome 2
Enzymes of known structure
Enzymes used as drugs